Igor Gongalsky (born November 5, 1986) is a Ukrainian former professional ice hockey player who last played with the Dundee Stars of the Elite Ice Hockey League (EIHL). Igor Gongalsky is a Doctor of Chiropractic (GMG Chiropractic) in Toronto now (Canada).

Playing career
Gongalsky played junior hockey in the Ontario Hockey League for the Owen Sound Attack and the Oshawa Generals.  In 192 OHL games he scored 31 goals and 40 assists for 71 points while racking up 270 penalty minutes.

After his junior career ended Gongalsky signed with the Fresno Falcons of the ECHL for the 2007–08 season.

Gongalsky re-signed with the Falcons for the 2008–09 season and played 28 games before being released, however he was signed by the Stockton Thunder on December 30, 2008.

During his time with the Thunder, Gongalsky earned a tryout with the San Antonio Rampage of the American Hockey League (AHL) and played 6 games before being returned to Stockton.  The Thunder re-signed Gongalsky for the 2009–10 season during which he put up 31 points in 55 games.

Before the start of the 2010–11 season the Thunder traded Gongalsky to the Greenville Road Warriors for Jim McKenzie.

On November 27, 2010, Gongalsky was signed by the Portland Pirates of the AHL to a professional tryout contract and then signed an AHL standard player contract on March 4, 2011.  Gongalsky was invited to the Pirates training camp the following season but was not successful in making the team and was returned to the ECHL on December 12, 2011 where his rights were held by the Gwinnett Gladiators at that time.  Just 9 days later he was signed to a professional tryout contract by the Rochester Americans of the AHL.  On February 24, 2012 it was announced that the Americans has signed Gongalsky to a contract and he played out the rest of the season with them.

For the 2012-13 season Gongalsky returned to his home country of Ukraine by signing with HC Berkut of the Professional Hockey League of Ukraine.  Gongalsky played 33 games with HC Berkut scoring 29 points.

Gongalsky returned to North America for the 2013–14 season by signing a contract with the South Carolina Stingrays of the ECHL.  He was invited to the Providence Bruins training camp on September 22, 2013 but was unsuccessful in making the team and returned to the Stingrays.

On August 15, 2014, Gongalsky left North America and moved to the United Kingdom in signing a one-year contract with the Dundee Stars of the EIHL. At the conclusion of the season, Gongalsky announced his retirement from the professional game.

Career statistics

References

External links

1986 births
Dundee Stars players
Fresno Falcons players
Greenville Road Warriors players
Gwinnett Gladiators players
Living people
Oshawa Generals players
Owen Sound Attack players
Portland Pirates players
Rochester Americans players
San Antonio Rampage players
South Carolina Stingrays players
Sportspeople from Kyiv
Stockton Thunder players
Ukrainian ice hockey left wingers
Ukrainian expatriate ice hockey people
Expatriate ice hockey players in the United States
Expatriate ice hockey players in Canada
Expatriate ice hockey players in Scotland
Ukrainian expatriate sportspeople in Scotland
Ukrainian expatriate sportspeople in the United States
Ukrainian expatriate sportspeople in Canada